A rainforest is a forest characterized by high rainfall

Rainforest or rain forest may also refer to:

Music
Rain Forest, 1976 album and song by Biddu

Rain Forest (Jeremy Steig and Eddie Gómez album), 1980

Rain Forest (Walter Wanderley album), 1966
Rainforest, 1984 song and 1985 album by Paul Hardcastle

"Rainforest", 2021 song by Noname
Rainforest (album), 1989 album by Robert Rich

Other
Rainforest Cafe, a restaurant chain owned by Landry's
Rainforest (novel), 1987 novel by Jenny Diski
Rain Forest, a bronze fountain/sculpture by James FitzGerald

See also
FernGully: The Last Rainforest, 1992 animated feature film
 Rainforest people(s) of Australia
 Temperate rainforest, rainforest located in temperate zone
Tropical rainforest, rainforest located in the tropics